John Drinker House is a historic home located at Bunker Hill, Berkeley County, West Virginia. It was built about 1815 and is a two-story, five bay, limestone dwelling in the Federal style.  It features an arched stone main entrance.  The property includes the ruins of a log home that pre-dates the Drinker House, ruins of a stone smokehouse, and the ruins of slave quarters.  A dump pile is also located on the property.  The house was built by John Drinker (1760–1826), a Quaker portrait artist from Philadelphia. The house is believed to have been a stop on the Underground Railroad.

It was listed on the National Register of Historic Places in 1980.

References

External links

Houses on the Underground Railroad
Houses on the National Register of Historic Places in West Virginia
Federal architecture in West Virginia
Houses completed in 1815
Houses in Berkeley County, West Virginia
National Register of Historic Places in Berkeley County, West Virginia
Slave cabins and quarters in the United States
Quakerism in West Virginia